IndieBox was a monthly independent video games (indie game) subscription box service. Working directly with the indie game developers, IndieBox designs and manufactures boxed collector’s edition physical releases of games that are typically only available in digital form. The company started operations in May 2014. Included in every monthly box is a digital rights management-free (DRM-free) game disc (custom-designed rewritable USB-stick for most boxes released before July 2016), Steam key, full-color printed instruction game manual, game soundtrack CD, sticker, and an exclusive collectible, such as a plushy or action figure of a notable character from that game. All games are packaged in a physical game box similar to software titles in the 1980s and 1990s.

IndieBox was founded by John Carter, Jason Blank, and James Morgan, and are assisted by various teams of volunteers to help with design, packaging, and shipping. They formed the company to create a Book of the Month Club-type service for independent video games; subscribers would not necessarily know what game they were getting, but the company's curation process would assure they would be getting a game with a strong reputation. When they started, they had to cold call several developers to gain interest, eventually signing on Rain Games to use their game Teslagrad as the first IndieBox title.

In October 2016, IndieBox partnered with GameStop to release a limited set of steelbook-case packages for ten titles, half of which had already previously received a collector's edition through IndieBox's service, to be retailed in the GameStop stores under the name "GameTrust Collection", based on GameStop's GameTrust publishing arm.

In October 2017, IndieBox announced it was closing down its subscription product; the company cited that the market for physical box releases was not as large as they had anticipated to cover all costs of preparing the boxes for subscribers. After completing its final box and handling existing accounts, the company will transition to help support online marketplace features for indie developers.

Past IndieBoxes:

References

External links
 

Video game distribution